Psychedelic trance, psytrance, or psy is a subgenre of trance music characterized by arrangements of rhythms and layered melodies created by high tempo riffs. The genre offers variety in terms of mood, tempo, and style. Some examples include full on, darkpsy, forest, minimal (Zenonesque), hitech psy, progressive, suomi, psy-chill, psycore (fusion of psychedelic trance and hardcore), psybient (fusion of psychedelic trance and ambient), psybreaks, or "adapted" tracks from other music genres. Goa trance preceded psytrance; when digital media became more commonly used psytrance evolved. Goa continues to develop alongside the other genres.

History

Origins

The first hippies who arrived in Goa, India (a former Portuguese colony) in the mid-1960s were drawn there for many reasons, including the beaches, the low cost of living, the friendly locals, the Indian religious and spiritual practices and the readily available Indian cannabis, which until the mid-1970s was legal. During the 1970s the first Goa DJs were generally playing psychedelic rock bands such as the Grateful Dead, Pink Floyd and The Doors. In 1979 the beginnings of electronic dance music could occasionally be heard in Goa in the form of tracks by artists such as Kraftwerk but it was not until 1983 that DJs Laurent and Fred Disko, closely followed by Goa Gil, began switching the Goa style over to electro-industrial/EBM which was now flooding out of Europe from artists such as Front 242 and Nitzer Ebb as well as Eurobeat.

The tracks were remixed, removing the lyrics, looping the melodies and beats and generally manipulating the sounds in all manner of ways before the tracks were finally presented to the dancers as custom Goa-style mixes.

By 1990–91 Goa was beginning to attract attention and had become a popular destination for partying. As the scene grew bigger, Goa-style parties spread like a diaspora all over the world from 1993. Parties like Pangaea and Megatripolis in the UK helped spawn a multitude of labels in various countries (U.K. Australia, Japan, Germany and Israel) to promote psychedelic electronic music that reflected the ethos of Goa parties, Goa music, and Goa-specific artists, producers, and DJs. Goa Trance as commercial scene began gaining global traction in 1994. The golden age of the first wave of Goa psy trance as a generally agreed upon genre was between 1994 and 1997.

Development

By 1992 the Goa trance scene had a pulse of its own, though the term 'Goa trance' did not become the characterization of the genre until around 1994. The Goa trance sound, which by the late 1990s was being used interchangeably with the term psychedelic trance, retained its popularity at outdoor raves and festivals, but also permanent psytrance nightclubs emerged such as Natraj Temple in Munich. New artists were appearing from all over the world and it was in this year that the first Goa trance festivals began, including the Gaia Festival in France and the still-running VooV festival in Germany.

In 1993 the first 100% Goa trance album was released, Project II Trance, featuring tracks by Man With No Name and Hallucinogen to name two. Goa trance enjoyed its commercial peak between 1996 and 1997 with media attention and some recognized names in the DJ scene joining the movement. This hype did not last long and once the attention had died down so did the music sales, resulting in the failure of record labels, promotion networks and also some artists. This ‘commercial death of Goa trance’ was marked musically by Matsuri Productions in 1997 with the release of the compilation Let it RIP. On the back sleeve of the album at the bottom of the notes, R.I.P : Mother Theresa, Princess Diana, William Burroughs & Goa Trance was written.

While the genre may have been incubated in the goa trance scene it went on to proliferate globally. Its impact was felt in western Europe, Middle East, North America, Australia, Japan and South Africa. Psytrance is linked to other music genres such as big beat, electroclash, grime and 2-step. The genre evolved in conjunction with a multimedia psychedelic arts scene.

Characteristics

Psychedelic trance has a distinctive, energetic sound that tends to be faster than other forms of trance or techno music with tempos generally ranging from 135 to 150 BPM but some psytrance songs can also reach 190BPM, 200bpm, 210bpm and even 300bpm. It uses a very distinctive bass beat that pounds constantly throughout the song and overlays the bass with varying rhythms drawn from funk, techno, dance, acid house, eurodance and trance using drums and other instruments. The different leads, rhythms and beats generally change every eight bars. Layering is used to create effect in psychedelic trance, with new musical ideas being added at regular intervals, often every four to eight bars. New layers will continue to be added until a climax is reached, and then the song will break down and start a new rhythmic pattern over the constant bass line. Psychedelic trance tracks tend to be six to ten minutes long. This includes a developed and atmospheric introduction, and a breakdown in the middle of the track of around 30 seconds to over a minute.

Subgenres

Dark psytrance
Dark psytrance (also known as dark psychedelic trance, dark psy, darkpsy or dark trance) is the heavier end of the psychedelic trance spectrum with tempos starting from around 150 bpm, but may often go faster. Characterized by having obscure, deep, and more eschatological background that leads into profound meditation of death, night, and transcendence, often with dismal sounds and heavy basslines. The subgenre often samples horror films in contrast to the science fiction film samples more regularly used in "normal" psytrance. Dark psytrance emerged as a recognizable genre after 2003 in Germany and Russia, with Brazilian, German and Russian artists dominating the scene. The German artist Xenomorph (Mark Petrick) is credited as an artist who first brought dark occult aesthetic into psytrance, with his album Cassandra's Nightmare released in 1998 being a major influence on the subgenre; X-Dream's Radio is another 1998 album cited as an early influence.

Suomisaundi

Suomisaundi is a variety originating in Finland during the mid-1990s.

Uplifting trance
Uplifting trance, is a subgenre of trance that incorporates more elaborate melodies and more attractive riffs, generally making use of arpeggios and producing a euphoric sound.[1] The name, which arose with the rise of progressive trance in 1997, is derives from the feeling that one feels when being listened to (uplifting means in English "to raise the spirit"). It is a very melodic trance, ranging from 132 BPM to 142 BPM.

Derivations

Psybient
Psybient, also known as psychedelic ambient or ambient psy — is a genre of electronic music, that contains elements of ambient, downtempo, psychedelic trance, dub, world music, new wave, ethereal wave, and IDM. The genre is also known for different alternative names used in different time periods, — the earliest developments of the genre within ambient house and chill-out music scenes were known as psychill, psychedelic chillout, psy chillout, the later works within goa trance and psychedelic trance scenes are known as ambient psytrance or ambient goa. The dub derived developments are known as psydub and psystep.

Psybient pieces are structured to generate vast soundscapes or a "musical journey". Like psytrance, it emphasizes on-going rhythm and beat-matching, however, it is more lenient to beat changes than psytrance.

Festivals

In general, large psytrance festivals are culturally and musically diverse.

Earthdance, the world's largest synchronized music and dance festival for peace, arose from the psychedelic trance culture.

At the 2004 Glastonbury Festival in the United Kingdom, psytrance was given an entire day on the Glade stage.

The Alien Safari, Vortex, and Synergy festivals are just a few of South Africa's many recurring and long-running psytrance festivals.

Rainbow Serpent Festival, Esoteric Festival, New Psycle, and Earthcore (now discontinued) are just a few of Australia's long-running psytrance festivals, dubbed "doofs."

The Boom Festival in Portugal began as a psytrance festival but has since expanded to include world music. It is held in August every other year and combines social activism with cultural and spiritual elements.

The Ozora Festival in Hungary is an arts-focused event that emphasizes connecting with nature and oneself. Psytrance is still very popular at this festival.

Cultural research
In 2007 research was conducted on the global psytrance scene. 600 people from 40 countries provided detailed information via an online questionnaire.  The results were published as "Beyond Subculture and Post-subculture? The Case of Virtual Psytrance" in the Journal of Youth Studies.

In 2012 Graham St. John published Global Tribe: Technology, Spirituality and Psytrance, Equinox..

See also

List of electronic music genres
Hardcore
Suomisaundi
Trance music

References

Sources
 St John, Graham. (ed) 2010. The Local Scenes and Global Culture of Psytrance. London: Routledge..
 St John, G. 2011. DJ Goa Gil: Kalifornian Exile, Dark Yogi and Dreaded Anomaly. Dancecult: Journal of Electronic Dance Music Culture 3(1): 97–128.
 St John, G. 2012. Seasoned Exodus: The Exile Mosaic of Psyculture. Dancecult: Journal of Electronic Dance Music Culture 4(1): 4–37.
 St John, G. 2012. Global Tribe: Technology, Spirituality and Psytrance, Equinox..

External links

 
Goa trance music
Trance genres